Vincent Street Historic District is a national historic district located at Newberry, Newberry County, South Carolina.  The district encompasses seven contributing buildings in a compact residential neighborhood of Newberry. The residences date from the late-19th and early-20th century and include notable examples of the Greek Revival and Late Victorian styles.

It was listed on the National Register of Historic Places in 1980.

References 

Historic districts on the National Register of Historic Places in South Carolina
Victorian architecture in South Carolina
Greek Revival architecture in South Carolina
Historic districts in Newberry County, South Carolina
National Register of Historic Places in Newberry County, South Carolina
Newberry, South Carolina